Fredrick Louis Kohler (April 20, 1888 – October 28, 1938) was an American actor.

Career
Fred Kohler was born in Kansas City, Missouri or in Dubuque, Iowa. As a teen, he began to pursue a career in vaudeville, but worked other jobs to support himself. He lost part of his right hand in a mining accident during this time. Eventually he was able to join a touring company, and worked steadily in show business for several years. His son Fred Kohler Jr. also became an actor.

America's budding film industry drew a 20-something Kohler to Hollywood, where he made his start in silent films. His first role was in the 1911 short The Code of Honor, and he had an uncredited role in Cecil B. DeMille's feature film Joan the Woman (1917), but a steady stream of parts did not begin until The Tiger's Trail (1919).

Kohler's stern features earned him a niche playing villains. His role as Bauman in The Iron Horse (1924) is a notable example. With the advent of the talkies, Kohler reprised many of his silent roles in remakes with sound, particularly in Westerns based on novels by Zane Grey.

At the beginning of the sound era, he appeared in the Allan Dwan film Tide of Empire (1929) alongside Renée Adorée and Tom Keene.

Personal life and death
Kohler was married three times. In 1910 he married Ida Friedman; their son Fred Kohler, Jr., birthname Jesse William Koehler, was born September 4, 1911. In 1921 he was married to actress Marguerite Schweikert. In 1928 he was married to French actress Constance Marjorie Prole. He died of a heart attack on October 28, 1938, at age 50. He was buried in an unmarked grave at Inglewood Park Cemetery in South Los Angeles community of Inglewood, California.

Selected filmography

 Joan the Woman (1916) - L'Oiseleur's henchman (uncredited)
 The Tiger's Trail (1919) - 'Bull' Shotwell
 Soldiers of Fortune (1919) - McWilliams
 Behind the Door (1919) - Minor Role (uncredited)
 Polly of the Storm Country (1920)
 The Kentucky Colonel (1920) - Jim Britsides
 A Thousand to One (1920) - Donnelly
 Cyclone Bliss (1921) - Jack Hall
 Partners of the Tide (1921) - First Mate
 Thunder Island (1921) - Barney the Mate
 Conflict (1921) - Jevons' foreman (uncredited)
 The Stampede (1921) - Steve Norton
 A Daughter of the Law (1921) - George Stacey
 With Stanley in Africa (1922)
 The Scrapper (1922) - Oleson
 The Milky Way (1922)
 Yellow Men and Gold (1922) - Craven
 His Back Against the Wall (1922) - Arizona Pete
The Son of the Wolf (1922) - Malemute Kid
 Trimmed (1922) - Young Bill Young
 Perils of the Yukon (1922) - Capt. Whipple
 Without Compromise (1922) - Cass Blake
 Three Who Paid (1923) - Jim Quade
 The Flame of Life (1923) - Spring
 Thru the Flames (1923) - 'Red' Burke
 The Eleventh Hour (1923) - Barbara's Uncle
 Shadows of the North (1923) - Ray Brent
 Hell's Hole (1923) - Prisoner
 North of Hudson Bay (1923) - Armand LeMoir
 Anna Christie (1923) - Minor Role (uncredited)
 The Red Warning (1923) - Tom Jeffries
 The Dramatic Life of Abraham Lincoln (1924) - Slave Auctioneer
 Fighting Fury (1924) - 'Two-finger' Larkin
 The Iron Horse (1924) - Deroux
 Dick Turpin (1925) - Ring Announcer (uncredited)
 The Thundering Herd (1925) - Follansbee
 Riders of the Purple Sage (1925) - Henchman Tom Metzger (uncredited)
 Winds of Chance (1925) - Joe McCaskey
 The Prairie Pirate (1925) - Aguilar - the Bandit
 Danger Quest (1926) - Otto Shugars
 The Bar-C Mystery (1926)
 The Ice Flood (1926) - 'Cougar' Kid
 The Country Beyond (1926) - Joe Leseur
 Old Ironsides (1926) - Second Mate (uncredited)
 The Devil's Masterpiece (1927) - Reckless Jim Regan
 The Way of All Flesh (1927) - The Tough
 The Blood Ship (1927) - First Mate Fitz
 Underworld (1927) - 'Buck' Mulligan
 The Loves of Carmen (1927) - Gypsy Chief
 The Rough Riders (1927) - Sergeant Stanton
 Shootin' Irons (1927) - Dick Hardman
 Open Range (1927) - Sam Hardman
 The City Gone Wild (1927) - Gunner Gallagher
 The Gay Defender (1927) - Jake Hamby
 The Showdown (1928) - Winter
 Chinatown Charlie (1928) - Monk
 The Dragnet (1928) - 'Gabby' Steve
 The Vanishing Pioneer (1928) - Sheriff Murdock
 Forgotten Faces (1928) - Spider (Convict Number 1309)
 Sal of Singapore (1928) - Captain Sunday
 The Spieler (1928) - Red Moon
 The Case of Lena Smith (1929) - Stefan
 The Leatherneck (1929) - Heckla
 The Dummy (1929) - Joe Cooper
 Tide of Empire (1929) - Cannon
 The Quitter (1929) - Duffy Thompson
 Stairs of Sand (1929) - Boss Stone
 Thunderbolt (1929) - 'Bad Al' Frieberg
 River of Romance (1929) - Captain Blackie
 Broadway Babies (1929) - Perc Gessant
 Say It with Songs (1929) - Fred, Joe's Cellmate
 Hell's Heroes (1929) - Wild Bill Kearney
 Roadhouse Nights (1930) - Sam Horner
 Under a Texas Moon (1930) - Bad Man
 The Light of Western Stars (1930) - H.W. Stack
 A Soldier's Plaything (1930) - Hank
 The Lash (1930) - Peter Harkness
 Other Men's Women (1931) - Haley
 Fighting Caravans (1931) - Lee Murdock
 The Right of Way (1931) - Joseph Portugais
 Woman Hungry (1931) - Kampen
 Corsair (1931) - Big John
 X Marks the Spot (1931) - Edward P. Riggs
 Carnival Boat (1932) - Hack Logan
 The Rider of Death Valley (1932) - Lew Grant
 The Texas Bad Man (1932) - Gore Hampton
 The Fourth Horseman (1932) - Honest Ben Jones
 Call Her Savage (1932) - Silas Jennings
 Wild Horse Mesa (1932) - Rand
 The Constant Woman (1933) - Speakeasy Bouncer
 Under the Tonto Rim (1933) - Munther
 The Fiddlin' Buckaroo (1933) - Wolf Morgan
 Deluge (1933) - Jepson
 Ship of Wanted Men (1933) - Chuck Young
 The Wolf Dog (1933) - Joe Stevens
 Queen Christina (1933) - Member of Court (uncredited)
 Honor of the Range (1934) - Rawhide
 The Last Round-Up (1934) - Sam Gulden
 Half a Sinner (1934) - Brick
 Little Man, What Now? (1934) - Karl Goebbler
 The Man from Hell (1934) - Mayor Anse McCloud
 West of the Pecos (1934) - Sawtelle
 Horses' Collars (1935, Short) - Double Deal Decker
 Times Square Lady (1935) - 'Dutch' Meyers
 Wilderness Mail (1935) - Lobo McBain - aka Landau
 Mississippi (1935) - Captain Blackie
 Goin' to Town (1935) - Buck Gonzales
 Border Brigands (1935) - Captain Conyda
 Hard Rock Harrigan (1935) - Black Jack Riley
 Men of Action (1935) - Thorenson
Lightning Triggers (1935) - Bull Thompson
 Trails End (1935) - Wild Bill Holman
 Stormy (1935) - Deem Dorn
 Frisco Kid (1935) - Shanghai Duck
 Dangerous Intrigue (1936) - Brant
 It's Up to You (1936) - Torchy
 Heart of the West (1936) - Barton
 For the Service (1936) - Bruce Howard
 The Texas Rangers (1936) - Jess Higgins
 The Vigilantes Are Coming (1936, Serial) - General Jason Burr
 The Plainsman (1936) - Jake - A Teamster
 The Accusing Finger (1936) - Johnson
 Arizona Mahoney (1936) - Gil Blair
 Daughter of Shanghai (1937) - Captain Gulner
 The Buccaneer (1938) - Gramby
 Forbidden Valley (1938) - Matt Rogan
 Gangs of New York (1938) - Krueger
 Blockade (1938) - Pietro
 Painted Desert (1938) - Hugh Fawcett
 Billy the Kid Returns (1938) - Matson
 Lawless Valley (1938) - Tom Marsh
 Boy Slaves (1939) - Drift Boss (uncredited) (final film role)

References

External links

1888 births
1938 deaths
American male film actors
American male silent film actors
Vaudeville performers
Male actors from Missouri
20th-century American male actors
Burials at Inglewood Park Cemetery
Male Western (genre) film actors